Girls' School may refer to:

 "Girls' School" (song), a 1977 single by Wings
 Girls' School (1938 film), a comedy film
 Girls' School (1950 film), a drama film
 For the practice of separating schools by gender, see single-sex education
 Girlschool, a British heavy metal band